Comórtas Peile na Gaeltachta is an annual All Ireland Gaelic football competition contested by clubs from the Irish language-speaking Gaeltacht areas of Ireland. Clubs compete on a county-basis at first, in order to qualify for the tournament that is hosted by a different club from the Gaeltacht each year. The first competition was held in Gweedore, County Donegal in 1969 and was won by the local club CLG Ghaoth Dobhair. RTÉ Raidió na Gaeltachta provides radio coverage of both the regional qualifiers and the national finals, held over the June Bank Holiday. TG4 provides live television coverage of the men's semi-finals and finals on the June Bank Holiday Sunday and Monday, and these are also broadcast online.

History
The idea for the competition came about in 1968 at University College Dublin when both Antoin Ó Cearúill from CLG Ghaoth Dobhair and Antoin de Bairéad from An Ghaeltacht GAA were playing on the UCD Gaelic footbal team who won the Sigerson Cup. They were good friend and decided that their home teams should play each other, de Bairéad brought his time from Baile an Fheirtéaraigh to Ó Cearúil's Gaoth Dobhair to play in a friendly. On the 5th of January 1969 "In a blizzard" of snow as the Derry People/Donegal News said Baile an Fheirtéaraigh GAA got the better of Gaoth Dobhair – 3-6 / 0-3. Antoin de Bairéad himself scored two points on the day. That evening at a celebratory Cabaret in Óstán Radharc na Mara Antoin de Bairéad, Antoin Ó Cearúill, Seán Delap, Feardorcha Ó Colla and decided that there should be a competition between the Gaeltacht areas similar to the Sigerson Cup. Sean Delap said he would provide a trophy. 

On the 15 March 1969 the first ever official meeting for Cómórtas Peile na Gaeltachta was held in the Castle Hotel, Dublin. The following were elected
Toghadh na hoifigigh seo leanas:
Uachtarán: Seán Delap, Gaoth Dobhair.
Leasuachtarán: Commandant Seán Ó Colmáin, An Daingean.
Cathaoirleach: Antoin de Bairéad, Baile an Fheirtéaraigh.
Rúnaí: Feardorcha Ó Colla, Gaoth Dobhair.
Cisteoir: Séamus Mac Gearailt, Corca Dhuibhne. 

On the 23 May 1969 the competition was officially launched at the Gresham Hotel. Justice Seán Delap donated the trophy and Canon Hamilton from County Clare donated the 72 Medals. 

The inaugural competition was held in Gweedore, County Donegal on the 3rd August 1969. There was 8 teams present from 6 counties; 1 from Dún na nGall, Gaillimh, Port Láirge and an Mhí and two teams from Maigh Eo and Ciarraí.  The local club Gaoth Dobhair being crowned as champions against Baile an Fheirtéaraigh – 2-8 / 2-7. From 1975 onwards, the competition has also been contested at junior level.

The 2010 champions were Béal an Mhuirthead from Mayo at senior level, who won the tournament on home ground, and An Spidéal at junior level. Cloich Cheannfhaola from An Fál Carrach in Donegal hosted and subsequently won the 2011 senior title, beating Maigh Cuilinn of Galway in the final on a scoreline of 0.11 to 1.6. At junior level, Naomh Muire from the Rosses in Donegal won the title by beating Laochra Loch Lao of Belfast on a scoreline of 0.14 to 0.13.

The 2012 competition was held in Gaoth Dobhair, who are the joint most successful club in the competition's history. They managed to win the tournament outright on home soil also, the third consecutive team to do so. They beat Mayo's Cill tSéadhna, a team who remarkably made the final after three games in two days. Even more remarkably, they scored a total of 17 goals in 4 games (15 of them in the first 3 games). Gaoth Dobhair, however, were by far the superior team over the weekend. They won the final on a scoreline of 1–13 to 2–9. An estimated crowd of 10,000 attended the picturesque coastal region for the finals.

The Waterford club Rinn Ó gCuanach CLG hosted the competition in 2013, having last hosted it in 1999. The Kerry teams An Ghaeltacht and Lios Póil won the senior and junior finals respectively that year.

The 2017 finals of Comórtas Peile na Gaeltachta were played on the scenic shores of Lough Mask for the first time at Tuar Mhic Éadaigh, Co. Mayo.

The 2020 Comórtas Peile na Gaeltachta which was planned to be hosted by Naomh Anna, Leitir Móir, was deferred in response to government guidelines to deal with the COVID-19 pandemic in Ireland.

Senior Championship 1969–2022

Results by team 

!Beal Áthan Ghaorthaidh 
!1
!
!0
!
!
|}

Junior Championship 1975–2016

An Cailín Gaelach winners

References

1969 establishments in Ireland
1969 in Gaelic games
Gaelic football competitions in Ireland